Elias Ntaganda (born January 1, 1982 in Kinshasa) is a Rwandan football defender currently playing for APR FC.

International career
Ntaganda is currently a member of the Rwanda national football team and played the qualification matches for the 2010 Africa Cup of Nations.

References

1982 births
Living people
Footballers from Kinshasa
Rwandan footballers
Association football defenders
Rwanda international footballers
2004 African Cup of Nations players
APR F.C. players
21st-century Democratic Republic of the Congo people